Gwon Sun-geun (born 15 February 1969) is a South Korean freestyle swimmer. He competed in four events at the 1988 Summer Olympics.

References

External links
 

1969 births
Living people
South Korean male freestyle swimmers
Olympic swimmers of South Korea
Swimmers at the 1988 Summer Olympics
Place of birth missing (living people)